Muhammad ibn 'Ali 'Abd ash-Shakur was the Oromo Emir of Harar, Ethiopia (1856–1875). In the oral traditions of the Harari, he was reviled for having entered in an ilman gosa (adoptive brotherhood) with the Bokku of the Ala Oromo. This alliance enabled him to usurp the throne 30 August 1856 and oppress his own people by devaluing the city's currency while extracting a special mahalaq al-Oromo or Oromo tax. Richard Pankhurst also notes that Emir Muhammad forbade his subjects from eating rice or dates, "declaring that they were suitable only for rulers."

The native Harari appealed to khedive Isma'il of Egypt, who then directed Ra'uf Pasha, in command of the military expedition that had annexed Zeila and Berbera to Egypt in 1870, to march on Harar. Ra'uf Pasha occupied Harar October 1875, according to Trimingham, "without encountering any resistance except for some from the Oromo tribes. So ended the independence of the city-state of Harar after less than two centuries." Two letters of Emir Muhammad survive, both dated 6 October 1875, to Ra'uf Pasha, which discuss the terms of the city's surrender.

See also
List of emirs of Harar

References 

Emirs of Harar
Year of death missing
Year of birth missing